Wilantani (Aymara, Hispanicized spelling Vilantani) is a mountain in the Andes of southern Peru, about  high. It is situated in the Puno Region, El Collao Province, Santa Rosa District. Wilantani lies northeast of the mountain Wila Chunkara.

References

Mountains of Puno Region
Mountains of Peru